Wabbit Twouble ("Rabbit Trouble") is a Merrie Melodies cartoon starring Bugs Bunny, produced by Leon Schlesinger Productions and released on December 20, 1941 by Warner Bros. Pictures. This is the first of several Bugs Bunny cartoon titles that refer to Elmer Fudd's speech impediment, with the names of Bob Clampett, Sidney Sutherland, and Carl Stalling, as well as the roles of Story, Supervision, and Musical Direction, intentionally misspelled in the credits to match the speech impediment.

In the cartoon, Elmer expects to find rest and relaxation at Jellostone National Park. He mistakenly sets up camp in the neighborhood of Bugs' rabbit hole, but Bugs (and a neighboring bear) do not have much leisure in mind.

Tex Avery began the project which Clampett finished; Avery is not credited on screen. This was the first Bugs Bunny and Elmer Fudd cartoon directed by Clampett, with a story by Dave Monahan and musical direction by Carl W. Stalling. Although Sid Sutherland is the only credited animator, the short was also animated by Virgil Ross, Rod Scribner, and Robert McKimson. Mel Blanc provided the voices for Bugs and the bear, and Arthur Q. Bryan provided the voice for Elmer.

Plot
Elmer Fudd, driving his Ford Model T jalopy to a Conga beat, makes his way to Jellostone National Park (a pun on Yellowstone National Park) while looking forward to getting some rest. Elmer sets up his campsite by setting a campfire, and hanging a mirror on a tree and, beneath it, a washbasin on a table, hanging a hammock, and pitching his tent. The tent is positioned directly over Bugs Bunny's rabbit hole (just as Elmer had arrived, Bugs had posted a sign next to his hole saying 'Camp Here', then had retreated into the lair, covering it with grass as he went). From down there, Bugs breaks down the tent and drags it inside. Elmer reaches in and, in spite of resistance from below, retrieves the tent which is tied in knots. Bugs pops up, welcomes Elmer to Jellostone ("a restful retreat. Oh brudda!") and pulls Elmer's hat over his eyes. Elmer reaches in again and tries to yank Bugs out. After several attempts, Elmer pulls his hands out to find that his fingers are tied together. He nails a board over the hole ("that'll hold 'em alwhight, heh-heh-heh-heh-heh"). However, Bugs simply pushes it open, steps out and mimics Elmer. Bugs balloons up to Elmer's size and repeats what Elmer had said, labeling it "phooey". Elmer then settles into his hammock and quickly falls fast asleep, muttering to himself.

Bugs places a pair of glasses on Elmer's face, paints the lenses black and sets the alarm clock to go off at noon. When it wakes Elmer, he thinks it is nighttime because everything seems dark. He goes to his tent, takes off his day clothes to reveal night clothes underneath, and goes to bed. Bugs then removes the glasses from Elmer and crows like a rooster, awakening Elmer who believes it is the next morning.

Elmer washes his face but cannot reach his towel because it is hanging on a branch that Bugs keeps at a steady, short distance from him. Elmer blindly follows the towel ("I do this kind of stuff to him all through the picture", Bugs confides to the audience). He causes Elmer to step off a cliff edge. Elmer looks at the miraculous view of the Grand Canyon, but suddenly realizes he is in midair. He runs back to safety and holds on to Bugs for dear life. Bugs then confesses that he is the one pulling these gags and runs off, with a furious Elmer giving chase after retrieving a gun from his tent. However, he runs into a black bear. The bear starts growling, and so Elmer turns to a wildlife handbook for advice, which directs him to play dead.

The bear soon gives up (after sniffing Elmer's "B.O." – his feet), but Bugs climbs onto Elmer and starts growling exactly like the bear. He misbehaves in various ways to keep Elmer on the ground with his eyes shut, but just as he starts biting Elmer's foot, Elmer sees what is going on and grabs his shotgun. The bear returns and Bugs runs away just as Elmer swings the gun, clobbering the bear rather than the rabbit.  A chase ensues with Elmer and the bear running through the trees to the tune of the "William Tell Overture." Finally, the bear freaks Elmer out by riding on top of him.

When the bear is knocked off him after hitting a tree branch, Elmer gives up and packs everything into his car (almost including a huge tree). He passes the welcome sign at the gate on his way out, backs up and reads it again. He declares the promise of "a restful retreat" to be "bawoney!" and, to teach the park not to give false advertisement, he chops the sign to bits with an ax and stomps on the pieces while calling the park's "peace and wewaxation" promises "wubbish!" A ranger (along with Bugs) appears, and has an angry expression on his face. Elmer is arrested for the destruction of government property, and from his jail cell window he tells us that "anyway" he is "wid of that gwizzwy bear and scwewy wabbit! West and wewaxation at wast!" Unfortunately, he turns to find out that somehow he is sharing his cell with both Bugs and the black bear. They both ask how long he has in jail ("Pardon me but, how long ya in for, doc?" they ask).

Production
For the cartoon, Elmer was redesigned as a fat man (based on voice actor Arthur Q. Bryan's own physique) in an attempt to make him funnier. The "fat Elmer" would only make three more appearances in the Looney Tunes/Merrie Melodies canon – The Wabbit Who Came to Supper, The Wacky Wabbit and Fresh Hare, in addition to a cameo appearance in the war bond advertisement Any Bonds Today? – before returning to the slimmer form by which he is better known, for The Hare-Brained Hypnotist. This cartoon was the only time, though, that the "fat Elmer" also had a red nose. This is the only cartoon with the "fat" version of Elmer to remain under copyright; the other "fat Elmer" cartoons are in the public domain. Cartoon Network's anthology series ToonHeads later focused an episode on this particular design for Elmer in 1999 with "The Year Elmer Fudd Got Fat", which included Wabbit Twouble.

Reception
Animation historian David Gerstein writes, "Wabbit Twouble represents a variant on the trickster of fable and myth who doesn't wait to pester first. Clampett's Bugs invades others' lives for the fun of it—especially when those others seem, like Elmer, to be easy targets... Bugs has immediately identified Elmer as the perfect patsy and mocks his girth and mannerisms. From the point of view of the classic trickster, some people simply deserve a hard time."

Big Chungus

In December 2018, a still from the short depicting Bugs mocking Elmer by imitating his likeness became an Internet meme. The meme originated from fictitious cover art for a video game titled Big Chungus (with "chungus" being a neologism coined by video game journalist Jim Sterling in 2012) which featured the still and was popularized by a Facebook post by a GameStop manager in Colorado Springs, who alleged that a customer had inquired about purchasing the fictional game as a gift for her son. The meme was usually used as an ironic meme, often with "deep-fried" effects and nonsensical text.

In April 2021, the character was added to the mobile game Looney Tunes World of Mayhem.

Big Chungus was briefly featured in the 2021 film Space Jam: A New Legacy.

Home media
 DVD – Looney Tunes Golden Collection, Volume 1
 Blu-ray – Looney Tunes Platinum Collection, Volume 2
 Streaming – Boomerang, HBO Max

References

External links

 
 
 Wabbit Twouble on the Internet Archive

1941 films
1941 short films
1941 animated films
1940s animated short films
Films directed by Bob Clampett
Films directed by Tex Avery
Merrie Melodies short films
Films set in national parks
Films scored by Carl Stalling
Animated films about bears
Bugs Bunny films
Elmer Fudd films
Films produced by Leon Schlesinger
1940s Warner Bros. animated short films
Internet memes
Film and television memes
1940s English-language films